The 2017–18 Botswana Premier League is the 53rd season of the Botswana Premier League, the top-tier football league in Botswana, since its establishment in 1966. The season started on 23 September 2017 and finished on 23 May 2018.

Team summaries

Promotion and relegation
Nico United, Green Lovers F.C., and Mahalapye Hotspurs were relegated from the 2016–17 Botswana Premier League. They were replaced by three teams promoted from the Botswana First Division, the winners of the Northern group TAFIC F.C., the winners of the Southern group Sharps Shooting Stars, and playoff winners Uniao Flamengo Santos.

Standings

See also
2017–18 Mascom Top 8 Cup

References

External links

Botswana Premier League 2017/18
Botswana Premier League 2017 18 News
Botswana Premier League 2017/18 - Standings
Botswana Premier League 2017/18 - Matches and Results 

Botswana Premier League
Botswana
2017 in Botswana sport
2018 in Botswana sport